The Stołowe Mountains National Park, anglicized to Table Mountains National Park, is a national park in south-western Poland. It comprises the Polish section of the Table Mountains (Góry Stołowe), also known as the Table Mountains in English, which are part of the Sudetes range. It is located in Kłodzko County of the Lower Silesian Voivodeship, at the border with the Czech Republic. The area of strict protection is 3.76 km2.

History
The landscape of Table Mountains began to form 70 million years ago. The range's unique shape is a result of hundreds of thousands of years of erosion. There are several notable rock formations, among them Kwoka ("Hen"), Wielblad ("Camel") and Glowa wielkoluda ("Giant’s head"). Also, there is a sophisticated system of corridors which creates rock labyrinths.

Currently plant life is mostly made up of spruce, which was introduced to the area on the turn of the 19th century to replace pristine beech and fir forests, which had been cut. Natural woodland is scarce and covers only around 3% of the forested areas. There are peat bogs, one of which (area 393,000 m2) was listed as a strictly protected area in 1959. In the forested areas of the park there are deer, red deer, wild pig, squirrels, hedgehogs, many birds and reptiles including lizards and adders.

Flora 
The characteristic flora of the Great Peatbog Batorowski, one of the few raised peat bogs in Poland, is represented by species such as marsh pine, marsh or ordinary heater. This peatbog has been subject to strict protection since 1958, and visitors to the Table Mountains National Park are not allowed on these sites.

Inhabitation
The history of the Table Mountains is closely connected with the history of the Kłodzko region, located on the borderland of Silesia, Bohemia and Moravia. After Hussite wars of the 14th and 15th century, the area thrived and later on first spas at Kudowa, Duszniki and Polanica were opened. Duszniki is also a center of paper production – one of the first paper mills in Europe was opened there in 1605.

Gallery

Notes and references

National parks of Poland
Protected areas established in 1993
Parks in Lower Silesian Voivodeship
1993 establishments in Poland